Nebeur is a town and commune in the Kef Governorate, Tunisia. As of 2014 it had a population of 5,500.

See also
List of cities in Tunisia

References

Populated places in Tunisia
Communes of Tunisia
Tunisia geography articles needing translation from French Wikipedia